Tim Gorschlüter (born 24 August 1983) is a retired German footballer who played as a defender.

Career

Early career
Born in Hamm, Gorschlüter began his career in the youth from Sportfreunde Bockum and joined later to Hammer SpVgg and signed in January 2002 with Rot Weiss Ahlen.

Professional career
Gorschlüter began his professional career for Rot Weiss Ahlen in the 2. Bundesliga in the 2001–02 season. After four years with Ahlen in the 2. Bundesliga, he moved for one year to Rot-Weiss Essen during the summer of 2005 and returned to Rot Weiss Ahlen in the following year.

After having played 33 games in one year, Gorschlüter rejoined in summer 2007 Rot-Weiss Essen. In the 2008–09 season, he signed for the Regionalliga West club Sportfreunde Lotte.

On 14 April 2009, Gorschlüter signed a one-year contract with his former club Rot Weiss Ahlen. On 19 May 2010, he confirmed his return from Rot-Weiss Ahlen to Sportfreunde Lotte and signed a one-year contract with the Münsterländer club.

References

External links

1983 births
Living people
Sportspeople from Hamm
Association football defenders
German footballers
Rot Weiss Ahlen players
Rot-Weiss Essen players
Sportfreunde Lotte players
2. Bundesliga players
3. Liga players
Footballers from North Rhine-Westphalia